Paul Kavanagh (died 19 March 2022) was an Irish businessman and politician. He briefly served as a Fianna Fáil member of the 18th Seanad. He was nominated by the Taoiseach Charles Haughey, on 26 June 1989, to fill a vacancy after the 1989 general election. He did not contest the 1989 Seanad election.

He was the chief executive of Stream International. Kavanagh was also a member of the board of An Post, Aer Lingus, Eircom & CTT.

Kavanagh died on 19 March 2022, after a brief illness at University Hospital Limerick.

References

Year of birth missing
20th-century births
2022 deaths
Fianna Fáil senators
Businesspeople from County Dublin
Members of the 18th Seanad
Nominated members of Seanad Éireann